Oregano is a graphical software application for schematic capture and simulation of electrical circuits. The actual simulation is performed by the SPICE, Ngspice or Gnucap engines. It is similar to gEDA and KTechlab. It makes use of GNOME technology and is meant to run on free Unix-like operating systems  such as Linux, FreeBSD et al.

History

Oregano was first developed by Richard Hult, who worked on it until 2002. Most of the design ideas and a lot of the current code are still his.  He released various versions, up to version 0.23.  All of them were based on the Spice engine, and supported only the old GNOME libraries.

When Richard Hult stated that he wouldn't be able to continue developing the software, Ricardo Markiewicz and Andrés de Barbará continued his work, releasing a renewed Oregano, with support for the latest graphical libraries and adding support for the Gnucap engine, among other things.

Marc Lorber ported the whole code base from gtk+-2.x to gtk+-3.x. Bernhard Schuster took over the project in early 2013.

See also

 Comparison of EDA Software
 List of free electronics circuit simulators
 Dependencies: GNOME, SPICE, Ngspice or Gnucap

External links
 

GNOME Applications
Engineering software that uses GTK
Free software programmed in C
Free electronic design automation software
Electronic design automation software for Linux
Free simulation software
Electronic circuit simulators